Daxter is a 2006 platform video game developed by Ready at Dawn and published by Sony Computer Entertainment on the PlayStation Portable on March 14, 2006. A spin-off of the Jak and Daxter series, Daxter takes place during the 2-year timeskip occurring during the opening cutscene of Jak II; unlike the other installments of the franchise focusing primarily on Jak, the game focuses on the adventures of his sidekick Daxter while Jak is imprisoned.

Sony announced on April 3, 2007, that Daxter would join PSP greatest hits.

As of September 3, 2019, the game has sold 4.2 million copies, and received generally positive reviews from critics.

Gameplay
Players assume the role of Daxter in his role as a bug exterminator, while he is searching for his friend Jak throughout the game's story. Daxter can perform double jumping and ledge grabbing, can crouch to squeeze through narrow gaps, make use of trampolines to reach higher ledges and ride on ziplines, and make use of vehicles to move around the game world's map. Portals and gateways are encountered within the main environment which lead to locations containing missions that players must complete in order to advance the story.

Combat in the game focuses mainly on melee attacks using an electronic blue eco powered bug-swatter, with players able to perform combo attacks on multiple enemies. After the initial missions, the player gains access to an extermination tank which sprays green eco-based bug spray to stun enemies, with it later able to be upgraded with several new functions, including a jet pack to allow Daxter to fly, a flamethrower modification which can improve the effectiveness of the jet pack, and an ultrasonic attachment that shoots blue eco-based high radial damage projectiles. Damage taken from enemies and certain environmental hazards can be recovered by collecting green eco health packs, while the spray tank's supply can be regenerated by absorbing green eco clusters.

Two forms of collectibles can be found during the game, including Golden Bug-Gems, similar to the Metalhead Gems from the second and third installment of the Jak and Daxter series, along with the traditional Precursor Orbs, the latter of which can be used to unlock special features. In addition, players can unlock unique items by breaking picture frames found hidden throughout the game, and with a Jak X game connected to Daxter, can alter the character's goggles and, if the connected save file is 100% complete, a modified Hover Scooter paint scheme.

Dream sequences
During the course of the game, Daxter can unlock "Dream Sequences", a series of five bonus games located in a bedroom behind Osmo's shop and unlocked by collecting Precursor Orbs. These mini-games feature Daxter dreaming himself into various movies as the hero, and on completing them will gain either a new attack ability, a health upgrade or attain gold, website codes or character costume modifications.
 Matrix Reloaded – Based on the courtyard fight scene from The Matrix Reloaded; Daxter features as Neo while Gol Acheron features as the various Smiths. This level is unlocked by collecting one Precursor Orb.
 Braveheart – Based on either the Battles of Stirling or Falkirk from Braveheart; Daxter features as William Wallace while Gol Acheron features as the various English soldiers. This level is unlocked by collecting 100 Precursor Orbs.
 The Two Towers – Based on the Battle of Helm's Deep from The Lord of the Rings: The Two Towers; Daxter features as Gimli while Lurkers feature as the orcs trying to scale the walls of Helm's Deep. This is the first mini-game where Daxter is physically able to move around by using the left analog stick. This level is unlocked by collecting 200 Precursor Orbs.
 Raiders of the Lost Ark – Based on the Chachapoyan Temple from Raiders of the Lost Ark; Daxter features as Indiana Jones, who must defeat a number of Lurker snakes and spiders, as well as avoid rolling boulders. This level is unlocked by collecting 300 Precursor Orbs.
 Matrix – Based on the fight training sequence between Neo and Morpheus in The Matrix; Daxter features as Neo while the Farmer features as Morpheus. This level is unlocked by collecting 400 Precursor Orbs.
 Fellowship of the Ring – Based on the Mines of Moria from The Lord of the Rings: The Fellowship of the Ring; Daxter features as Gandalf the Grey while a Precursor Robot features as the Balrog. This level is unlocked by collecting 500 Precursor Orbs.

Combat Bugs
Throughout the game, Daxter will occasionally collect 'Combat Bugs', bugs which are used in a combat sport similar to "rock, paper, scissors". These bugs can be enhanced by collecting combat bug tokens or potions which are found hidden throughout the levels. The Combat Bug mini-game is not part of the game campaign and is accessed through the game start menu.

Plot
The game takes place in the final months of the 2-year gap presented in the opening of Jak II (and the aftermath of The Precursor Legacy), between the moment when Jak is taken prisoner by the Krimzon Guard and the time in which Daxter finally rescues him from the Krimzon Guard Fortress. The introduction shows Jak being captured, while Daxter manages to escape. Almost two years later (having no luck with rescuing Jak), Daxter has forgotten all about finding his friend. An old man named Osmo, whom Daxter meets, hires Daxter as an exterminator working in various parts of Haven City, and occasionally its environs, to exterminate bug-like Metal Heads referred to in-game as 'Metal Bugs'. During his adventures, Daxter meets a mysterious woman named Taryn who, despite being less than impressed by Daxter's interest in her, occasionally helps him.

After completing a number of missions for Osmo, Daxter sees Jak in a Prison Zoomer and attempts to chase after it. After being cornered by some Krimzon Guards (who had noticed Daxter's pursuit), Daxter is rescued by Osmo's son Ximon, who assists him with several more missions including one to Baron Praxis' palace where Daxter steals a map of the Fortress, the prison where Jak is being held. After returning to the extermination shop, an arthropod sidekick that Daxter acquired earlier is killed by Kaeden, a bitter man who seemingly wants to steal Osmo's shop, but, in actuality, is working for Kor, the Metal Head leader.

When Daxter tries to stop Kaeden from escaping the shop, Kaeden suddenly blows up the shop with a bomb he placed in the shop earlier. Daxter and Osmo survive, and Daxter promises to stop Kaeden, but only after he rescues Jak. Daxter infiltrates the Fortress and finds Kaeden, who reveals himself to be a giant Metal Bug. Daxter manages to defeat Kaeden, who tries to warn him that Kor is waiting outside for them, and then uses a hover platform to begin searching for Jak within the Fortress, leading into the opening cutscene from Jak II. After this, the game cuts to a point later in the timeline at Daxter's Naughty Ottsel Bar, where he is recounting the story to Jak, Keira, Samos, Tess, and Taryn.

Reception and sales

Daxter received "generally positive reviews", according to review aggregator Metacritic. As of September 3, 2019, the game has sold 4.23 million copies.

Daxter is regarded as one of the PSP's best titles by a number of websites. GamesRadar+ ranked Daxter the 4th best PSP game ever made, calling it “an absolute must-play for the PSP enthusiast.” Kotaku cited it as one of the 12 best PSP games, claiming it's “as funny as it is well-tuned.” Additionally, Digital Trends and TechRadar each listed Daxter among the 10 best PSP games, with the former specifying that “Daxter’s vibrant colors and subtle details inject the game with a ton of flair.”

References

External links

2006 video games
3D platform games
Interquel video games
Video games developed in the United States
Jak and Daxter
PlayStation Portable games
PlayStation Portable-only games
Video game prequels
Video games about insects
Video games set in prison
Video games set on fictional planets
Video game spin-offs
Multiplayer and single-player video games
Mercenary Technology games